The Aesthetics of Culture in "Buffy the Vampire Slayer" is a 2006 academic publication relating to the fictional Buffyverse established by TV series, Buffy and Angel.

Examination of the cultural commentary contained in Buffy. The show was a somewhat unusual vehicle used to present, quite typical views of late 20th century culture-teenage problems via the character of Buffy Summers. The covers topics such as broken homes and the search for meaning in life. Subtler themes are always included; such as cultural views of knowledge, ethnicity and history.

Organized into two sections:

 Through the lens of Buffy's confrontation with culture
 From the complex perspectives  the individual characters. Issues such as values, ethical choices and the implications of one’s actions are discussed—without ever losing sight of the limitations of a medium that will always be dominated by financial concerns. The final chapter summarizes what Buffy has to say about today's society.

An appendix lists Buffy episodes in chronological order.

External links
Slayage.tv - "Restless Readings–Involution, Aesthetics, and Buffy" essay from book.

Books about the Buffyverse
2006 non-fiction books